is a railway station on the Jōhana Line in city of Takaoka, Toyama, Japan, operated by West Japan Railway Company (JR West).

Lines

Layout
The station has two ground-level opposed side platforms serving two tracks, connected to the station building by a footbridge. The station is unattended.

Platforms

Adjacent stations

History
The station opened on 4 May 1894. With the privatization of Japanese National Railways (JNR) on 1 April 1987, the station came under the control of JR West.

Passenger statistics
In fiscal 2015, the station was used by an average of 870 passengers daily (boarding passengers only).

Surrounding area
Takaoka Minami High School
Takaoka City Hall - Toide branch office

See also
 List of railway stations in Japan

References

External links

 

Railway stations in Toyama Prefecture
Stations of West Japan Railway Company
Railway stations in Japan opened in 1894
Jōhana Line
Takaoka, Toyama